Bart Albert Liliane De Wever ( born 21 December 1970) is a Belgian politician. Since 2004, De Wever has been the leader of the New Flemish Alliance (N-VA), a political party advocating for the independence of Flanders. He is also a member of the Chamber of Representatives. De Wever played a prominent role in the 2007 Belgian government formation and presided over his party's victory in the 2010 federal elections when N-VA became the largest party in both Flanders and in Belgium as a whole.

Since January 2013, he has been Mayor of Antwerp, following the 2012 municipal elections.

Biography
De Wever was born in Mortsel and grew up in Kontich where his parents Irene and Henri owned a small supermarket. His father had previously worked for a Belgian railway company and was briefly active in the Vlaamse Militanten Orde before becoming a local administrator for the Volksunie.  De Wever's older brother is historian and professor  who teaches at Ghent University. His grandfather had been the secretary of the Flemish National Union, a Flemish far-right party from the interwar period that had been recognised as the ruling party of Flanders during the Nazi occupation of Belgium. However, during an interview, Bart De Wever nuanced his grandfather's past by claiming he had not collaborated with the Nazis.

De Wever began studying a law degree at the University of Antwerp but dropped out before switching to study History Saint Ignatius University Centre, Antwerp and then the Catholic University of Leuven (KUL), graduating with a licentiate (equivalent of the master's degree) followed by a PhD in History. As a student he was a member of the classical liberal Liberaal Vlaams Studentenverbond (LVSV, Liberal Flemish Students' Union) and the conservative Katholiek Vlaams Hoogstudentenverbond (KVHV, Catholic Flemish Students' Union) of Antwerp and Leuven. He is a former editor-in-chief of the KVHV newspapers Tegenstroom (magazine of KVHV in Antwerp) and Ons Leven (in Leuven). After graduating, he was employed as a research assistant working on the Nieuwe Encyclopedie van de Vlaamse Beweging (New Encyclopedia of the Flemish Movement) and published a biography of controversial Flemish politician Joris Van Severen.

De Wever is married to a Dutch national with whom he has four children. They live together in Deurne. In 2012, De Wever undertook a crash diet and lost 60 kilos. His physical transformation was noted by the Belgian media and he subsequently published a book advising on weight loss. De Wever has cited marathon running as his main interest outside of politics.

In addition to Dutch, De Wever speaks French, English and German.

Political career
De Wever initially started his political career as a member of the Volksunie (People's Union) party which his father had belonged to and was elected as a municipal councilor in Berchem for the party. During the ideological splits in the Volksunie, De Wever became part of the so-called Oranjehofgroep along with Frieda Brepoels, Eric Defoort, Ben Weyts and Geert Bourgeois. The Oranjehofgroup was a political clique within the Volksunie composed of right-wing, conservative-liberal and Flemish nationalist members who opposed the left-orientated direction the party was being taken under Bert Anciaux. The members of the Oranjehofgroep would later found the N-VA together. In 2004, he was elected as party leader of the N-VA with 95% of the votes, being the only candidate up for election. Initially, the N-VA had followed the political style of the People's Union by characterizing itself as a big tent party, however under De Wever's leadership the N-VA took on a conservative identity and has seen a rise in support since.

De Wever went through a rough stretch in 2006, when he accepted the conservative-liberal Jean-Marie Dedecker as an N-VA member, causing a split with the CD&V party. In order to reconcile the party, Dedecker had to leave. Although he was extensively criticised, the local N-VA leaders permitted De Wever to remain as N-VA president.

In the 2009 regional elections, his party won an unexpectedly high 13% of the votes, making N-VA the overall winner of the elections together with old cartel partner CD&V. N-VA subsequently joined the government, with De Wever choosing to remain party president and appointing two other party members as ministers in the Flemish Government and one party member as speaker of the Flemish Parliament.

Under his presidency his party gained around 30% of the votes in Flanders during federal elections held on 13 June 2010. De Wever himself won the most preference votes of the Dutch-speaking region (nearly 800,000).

De Wever visited former British Prime Minister David Cameron at 10 Downing Street on a number of occasions and maintained contact with Boris Johnson during his time as Mayor of London.

After the 2019 federal election, De Wever has shown interest to make a new political centre-right movement. His goal is to reduce the number of political parties in parliament and go to a more American and British style parliament with fractions within larger parties (drawing on the Conservative and Labour and Republican Party and Democratic Party dualism in the UK and USA respectively). De Wever has expressed his desire to attract CD&V, Open VLD and some Vlaams Belang voters. Joachim Coens, former leader of CD&V, supports the idea and argues it would make future government formations easier.

In November 2020, he was reelected leader of the N-VA with 96.8% of the votes for a new three-year mandate. This made De Wever the longest serving leader of a Belgian political party.

In March 2022, he said during a radio interview that Russian President Vladimir Putin will not end Russia’s invasion of Ukraine, as he is a "psychopath" and a "madman", adding: "[Putin] said: ‘I will squash the Russians who are against me like mosquitoes’. When did I hear that before? I think here, 70 years ago."

2010 Belgian Federal Election

An early election was held on 13 June 2010, resulting in the N-VA winning most votes in the Dutch-speaking areas and the Socialist Party (PS) in French-speaking Belgium. Nationally the two parties were almost even with 27 seats for the N-VA and 26 for the PS, the remaining seats being split between ten other parties. For 541 days after the elections, no agreement could be reached among the parties on a coalition to form a new government and during that period the country continued to be governed by an interim government. On 6 December 2011, the Di Rupo I Government was sworn in. De Wever and the N-VA were not included in the makeup of this government.

Regarding the 25 May 2014, federal election, PS party leader Elio Di Rupo noted that his party will be unwilling to enter into a dialogue with De Wever and the N-VA regarding forming a new federal government.

Political positions
Politically, De Wever calls himself as a conservative and a Flemish nationalist He is an avowed admirer of Edmund Burke and his political philosophy, and has described British conservative writer and social critic Theodore Dalrymple, former Prime Minister Margaret Thatcher and Austrian economist Friedrich Hayek as influences. De Wever has also written opinion columns and essays for De Morgen and De Standaard which he published as a book titled The Precious Fabric of Society in 2008. Political philosopher Jason Stanley has opined that De Wever is a master of "polite xenophobia" whereas Belgian political scientist Carl Devos argues that De Wever is to the right of most mainstream Belgian politicians and takes a firmer stance on immigration and integration issues but is not xenophobic or populist.

Professor of digital media and politics Ico Maly has argued that De Wever's political communication consists of four ideological components:  defense of enlightenment, neoliberalism and Flemish nationalism. According to Maly, De Wever argues for a culturally homogeneous nation preserved with the existing order. Newcomers can join the community if they subscribe to the identity of that ethnic nation and if they promote and maintain the moral order. De Wever has called for stricter policies on immigration and integration, including compulsory language tests for immigrants.

De Wever has also spoken in favour of the Greater Netherlands concept in which Flanders and the Netherlands can potentially be united into the same country or under a federal agreement, arguing that Dutch and Flemings are "the same people separated by the same language."

De Wever has expressed criticism of the cordon sanitaire placed on the Vlaams Belang (VB) party, describing it as undemocratic and counterproductive, and following the 2019 Belgian federal election stated that he was considering breaking it to include the VB as a potential coalition partner. Although De Wever and the N-VA held official talks with the VB in 2019, they ultimately did not form an agreement.

Controversies

In 1996, he was photographed attending a conference held by the French extreme-right Front National leader Jean-Marie Le Pen. De Wever justified his attendance by arguing 

In October 2007, in reaction to the apology of the Mayor of Antwerp for his city's collaboration in the deportation of Jews during World War II, Bart De Wever said that:
"Antwerp did not organise the deportation of the Jews, it was the victim of Nazi occupation ... Those who were in power at the time had to take tricky decisions in difficult times. I don't find it very courageous to stigmatise them now."
He later issued an apology to representatives of Antwerp's Jewish community. Following these events, in an op-ed published in Le Monde, the Belgian French-speaking writer Pierre Mertens claimed that Bart De Wever was a "convinced negationist leader". De Wever sued Mertens for this allegation.

In July 2016, he called Angela Merkel personally responsible for the "mess she, herself has created" in relation to the 2016 terrorist attacks in Germany. On the radio channel Radio 1, he 
claimed that Angela Merkel should have led a European military coalition against ISIS/ISIL in 2015, that she was not a true leader, and insinuated that she could have partially prevented the attacks. De Wever was criticized for this by the leader of the SP.A, John Crombez, who said to be ashamed for the claim that Merkel would be the cause of the "great problems in Europe". De Wever's remarks were also countered by other Belgian politicians, as well as by a Flemish journalist. De Wever also claimed that Merkel has caused the rise of Donald Trump, Geert Wilders and Marine Le Pen.

In a 2019 interview with Flemish newspaper De Zondag, De Wever argued that mass migration was impacting on identity, enlightenment and integration, and that immigrants from Muslim backgrounds were more likely to force their beliefs in public over other religious groups, stating "I have not yet seen an Orthodox Jew who wants a counter function in Antwerp. They avoid conflict. That is the difference. Muslims do claim a place in public space, in education, with their outward signs of faith. That creates tensions" while arguing that he supports freedom of religion and worship. He also accused the left of cultural relativism, claiming "The same left that set bras on fire in May '68 is now embracing the headscarf as a symbol of equality. I find that very strange. They wanted to destroy Christianity, but they accept everything about Islam. I call that submission." De Wever's comments were criticised by Socialist Party politician Paul Magnette who called them "a form of racism." Magnette's comments were in turn refuted by De Wever and N-VA minister Jan Jambon.

Death threats and illness

In December 2013, the Belgian newspaper Het Laatste Nieuws received a bullet in the post with a letter addressed to Bart De Wever, apparently from a communist extremist. De Wever received police protection.

In November 2013, De Wever was admitted to hospital with severe anxiety and chest pains. He was readmitted into an intensive care unit in February 2014, with a severe lung infection.

Panda suits
In March 2014, Bart De Wever made a live appearance at the Flemish television awards, dressed in a Panda suit; a reference to a decision by the Di Rupo government to import two pandas at a cost per panda greater than the legal maximum director's salary in Belgium. Nevertheless, because those pandas are initially gifts from the People's Republic of China, Di Rupo thought of it as impolite to refuse.

PGL Antwerp 2022
De Wever made a guest appearance on the front stage of the PGL Antwerp 2022 Counter-Strike:Global Offensive tournament.

References

External links

1970 births
Living people
Belgian columnists
21st-century Belgian historians
Flemish politicians
KU Leuven alumni
Mayors of Antwerp, Belgium
Members of the Flemish Parliament
MEPs for Belgium 2009–2014
New Flemish Alliance MEPs
New Flemish Alliance politicians
People from Mortsel
People's Union (Belgium) politicians